Blanefield railway station served the village of Blanefield, Stirling, Scotland from 1867 to 1959 on the Blane Valley Railway.

History 
The station opened on 1 July 1867 by the North British Railway. The signal box, which opened in 1894, was to the west next to the level crossing. The station closed to passengers on 1 October 1951. Goods traffic continued until 5 October 1959.

References

External links 

Disused railway stations in Stirling (council area)
Railway stations in Great Britain opened in 1867
Railway stations in Great Britain closed in 1951
Former North British Railway stations
1867 establishments in Scotland
1959 disestablishments in Scotland